Simmel is a German language surname. It may refer to:

Ernst Simmel (1882–1947), German psychologist
Friedrich Simmel (born 1970), German biophysicist 
Georg Simmel (1858–1918), German sociologist
Johannes Mario Simmel (1924–2009), Austrian writer
Marianne Simmel (1923–2010), American psychologist

German-language surnames
Jewish surnames